Banking Committee may refer to:
 Canadian Senate Standing Committee on Banking, Trade and Commerce
 United States Senate Committee on Banking, Housing, and Urban Affairs
 United States House Committee on Financial Services (also referred to as the House Banking Committee)